The Flute-Player (Gollancz, 1979) is a fiction book by British novelist, poet, playwright and translator Donald Michael Thomas, known as D. M. Thomas. Thomas considers the book to be one of his six strongest novels. It was Thomas's first novel to be published, though it was the second he had written.

The book tells the story of Elena, a woman in an unspecified city and unspecified country who lives through tumultuous political changes. During this time she is forced to make ends meet by working as a prostitute, dancer, artist's model and servant. According to Thomas, "This novel emerged out of fascination with Russian poets and particularly Anna Akhmatova. I wanted a generic figure, a woman who preserved the truth of the word, while chaos reigned all around her. I didn't want to individualise the characters too much, so there is very little dialogue in this novel."

The plot is told in the past tense third person except for short sections in the present tense and first person.

It won the Gollancz/Guardian Fantasy Prize.

References

1979 British novels
Novels by D. M. Thomas
Victor Gollancz Ltd books